The 57th Adversary Tactics Group (57 ATG) was the flying component of the 57th Wing, assigned to the United States Air Force Air Combat Command. The group was stationed at Nellis Air Force Base, Nevada, prior to being merged with the 57th Operations Group on 31 March 2020.

Overview
The 57th ATG was formed on 1 July 2005 with the objective of consolidating all Aggressor activities under one organization to provide the Combat Air Forces with the opportunity to train against a realistic, fully integrated threat array during large- and small-scale exercises such as Red Flag – Nellis, Red Flag – Alaska, Maple Flag, Green Flag and dissimilar air combat training deployments.

The official USAF Aggressor program was born in 1972 as a response to the poor aerial combat performance of U.S. Air Force aircrews in Vietnam. The Aggressors' charter remains to this day to improve combat performance through realistic, challenging training and education. They accomplish this as the USAF's professional adversaries, flying F-15 and F-16 aircraft for Red Flag and Maple Flag exercises, USAF Weapons School syllabus support, priority test mission support and road shows that visit various units throughout the CAF.

The group was merged with the 57th Operations Group on 31 March 2020.

Units
Established in July 2005, the 57th ATG (tail code: WA) consisted of Aggressor squadrons that replicate adversary threat tactics while training combat air forces aircrews.
 57th Adversary Tactics Support Squadron
 57th Information Aggressor Squadron
 64th Aggressor Squadron
 65th Aggressor Squadron
 177th Information Aggressor Squadron
 507th Air Defense Aggressor Squadron
 547th Intelligence Squadron

History
 See Also 4477th Tactical Evaluation Flight
Replaced the Aggressor flying components of the 57th Operations Group, placing them all under a single organization.  Has trained combat aircrews in adversary threat tactics since its inception.

Lineage
 Established as 57th Adversary Tactics Group on 31 Aug 2005
 Activated on 15 Sep 2005
 Inactivated on 31 March 2020.

Assignments
 57th Wing, 15 Sep 2005 – 31 March 2020

Components
 64th Aggressor Squadron: 15 Sep 2005 – 31 March 2020
 65th Aggressor Squadron: 15 Sep 2005 – 26 September 2014
 527th Space Aggressor Squadron: 14 Apr 2006 – 31 March 2020
 547th Intelligence Squadron, 15 Sep 2005–2014
 57th Adversary Tactics Support Squadron, 15 Sep 2005 – 31 March 2020

Stations
 Nellis AFB, NV, 15 Sep 2005 – 31 March 2020

Aircraft
 F-15 Eagle, 2005–2014
 F-16 Fighting Falcon, 2006–31 March 2020

References

 Nellis AFB 57th Wing Factsheet

External links

057